Veliki Otok is a village north of Postojna in the Inner Carniola region of Slovenia. The entrance to Postojna Cave lies immediately east of the village. A second karst cave, known as Otok Cave, lies 1 km north of the settlement.

The church in the centre of the settlement is dedicated to Saint Catherine. A second church on a small hill close to the entrance to Otok Cave is dedicated to Saint Andrew. Both belong to the Parish of Postojna.

References

External links
Veliki Otok on Geopedia

Populated places in the Municipality of Postojna